Mount Alice is a mountain located at the Queens Reach arm of the Jervis Inlet within the Pacific Ranges of the Coast Mountains in British Columbia Canada.  The mountain was named during the 1860 survey by  who charted all of the known area and named the mountain after Alice Maud Mary who was the third child of Queen Victoria and Prince Albert.

References

External links
Detail Map of Mount Alice from the 1860 Survey Map of the Jervis Inlet and Mt.Alice.

One-thousanders of British Columbia
Pacific Ranges
New Westminster Land District